The 40th parallel south is a circle of latitude that is 40 degrees south of the Earth's equatorial plane. It crosses the Atlantic Ocean, the Indian Ocean, Australasia, the Pacific Ocean and South America. Its long oceanic stretches are the northern domain of the Roaring Forties.

On 21 June 2018, the sun is at 26.17° in the sky and at 73.83° on 21 December, in King Island, Tasmania, which is near the 40th parallel.

The maximum altitude of the Sun is > 35.00º in April and > 28.00º in May.

Around the world
Starting at the Prime Meridian and heading eastwards, the parallel 40° south passes through:

{| class="wikitable plainrowheaders"
! scope="col" width="125" | Co-ordinates
! scope="col" | Country, territory or ocean
! scope="col" | Notes
|-
| style="background:#b0e0e6;" | 
! scope="row" style="background:#b0e0e6;" | Atlantic Ocean
| style="background:#b0e0e6;" |
|-
| style="background:#b0e0e6;" | 
! scope="row" style="background:#b0e0e6;" | Indian Ocean
| style="background:#b0e0e6;" |
|-
| 
! scope="row" | 
| King Island, Tasmania
|-
| style="background:#b0e0e6;" | 
! scope="row" style="background:#b0e0e6;" | Indian Ocean
| style="background:#b0e0e6;" | Bass Strait
|-
| 
! scope="row" | 
| Flinders Island, Tasmania
|-
| style="background:#b0e0e6;" | 
! scope="row" style="background:#b0e0e6;" | South Pacific
| style="background:#b0e0e6;" | Tasman Sea
|-
| 
! scope="row" | 
| Manawatū-Whanganui region – passing just south of WhanganuiHawke's Bay region – passing through Waipukurau
|-
| style="background:#b0e0e6;" | 
! scope="row" style="background:#b0e0e6;" | Pacific Ocean
| style="background:#b0e0e6;" |
|-
| 
! scope="row" | 
| Los Ríos Region – passing through Punta Galera and Pirihueico Lake
|-
| 
! scope="row" | 
|Neuquén ProvinceRío Negro ProvinceBuenos Aires Province
|-
| style="background:#b0e0e6;" | 
! scope="row" style="background:#b0e0e6;" | Atlantic Ocean
| style="background:#b0e0e6;" |
|}

See also
39th parallel south
41st parallel south
Roaring Forties
Project Loon

References

s40